Pucci may refer to:

Members of the Pucci family, a major Florentine political family
Antonio di Puccio Pucci (c. 1350–1416), Florentine politician and architect
Puccio Pucci (politician) (1389–1449), Florentine politician, son of Antonio
Lorenzo Pucci (1458–1531), Italian cardinal
Roberto Pucci (1462–1547), Italian cardinal
Antonio Pucci (cardinal) (1485–1544), Italian cardinal
Francesco Pucci (politician) (1437–1518), Florentine politician
Pandolfo Pucci (died 2 January 1560), responsible for the Pucci plot
Orazio Roberto Pucci (Florence, 1625–1698), first Marchese di Barsento
Emilio Pucci (1914–1992), fashion designer and politician. Also, the name of an Italian fashion brand.
Alessandra Pucci (born 1942), Australian biochemist and entrepreneur
Antonio Pucci (poet) (c. 1310–1388), Florentine poet
Antonio Maria Pucci (1819–1892), Italian saint
Antonio Pucci (driver) (1923–2009), Italian race driver
Ben Pucci (1925–2013), professional American football tackle
Cindy Pucci, American model
Enrico Pucci (JoJo's Bizarre Adventure), fictional character from JoJo's Bizarre Adventure
Francesco Pucci (archbishop), archbishop of Pisa in 1362
Francesco Pucci (humanist) (Florence, 1436–1512), ally of Poliziano, active in the milieu of the Neapolitan Aragonese
Francesco Pucci (patrizio of Catania), patrizio of Catania in 1860
Frank Pucci (1966–2018), American musician 
Josephine Pucci (born 1990), women's ice hockey player
Lou Taylor Pucci (born 1985), American actor
Luciano Pucci Burti (born 1975), Brazilian racing driver
Michael Pucci (born 1963), Australian politician
Puccio Pucci (1904–1985), Italian athlete (middle-distance runner), lawyer and sports official
Vincent Pucci (born 1989), French engineer and blogger